Adam of Harcarse (died 1245) was a 13th-century Cistercian Abott. He served as Abbot of Newbattle between 1216 and 1219 and then Abbot of Melrose from 1219 until his death in 1245.

Biography
Adam was a cellarer at Newbattle Abbey before he succeeded Richard as the Abbot of Newbattle Abbey on 20 August 1216, serving until he was elected Abbot of Melrose Abbey on 6 August 1219. During 1235, he accompanied Patrick II, Earl of Dunbar with a Scottish army together with Gilbert, the Bishop of Galloway, to quell the revolt in Galloway and forced the submission of Tomás mac Ailein and Gille Ruadh.

Citations

References

Year of birth unknown
1245 deaths
Abbots of Melrose
13th-century Scottish Roman Catholic priests